"Wait Until Tomorrow" is a song by the Jimi Hendrix Experience from their 1967 second album Axis: Bold as Love. Written by Jimi Hendrix, the song details the scenario of a male protagonist addressing his female love with whom he plans to leave home, only to be shot dead by her father. Despite not being released as a single, "Wait Until Tomorrow" has been recognized as one of the strongest songs on the album.

Background and style
"Wait Until Tomorrow" was one of the first "situation song[s]" written by Hendrix and is said to be influenced by soul artists such as the Isley Brothers (with whom Hendrix performed before forming the Experience) and stylistically similar to guitarist Steve Cropper. A "head-on boy–girl song", "Wait Until Tomorrow" was one of the final songs recorded for the album on October 26, 1967, before the album was completed with the recording of title track "Bold as Love" three days later. In an AllMusic review, Matthew Greenwald described the progression and style of the song:

Reception
Reviews of Axis: Bold as Love have generally mentioned "Wait Until Tomorrow" in a positive light. Matthew Greenwald of allmusic identifies the "playful song" as "one of the low-key highlights" of the album, while Parke Puterbaugh of Rolling Stone describes it as a "taut, funky, could've-been-hit." In reviewing the album for the BBC, Chris Jones summarised "Wait Until Tomorrow" as "a wry, funky little tale," while Sputnikmusic reviewer "Broken Arrow" comments:

References

1967 songs
The Jimi Hendrix Experience songs
Songs written by Jimi Hendrix
Song recordings produced by Chas Chandler